This is a list of the vice-admirals of Orkney and Shetland.

The Vice-Admiral of Orkney and Shetland was originally a heritable post, in the hands of the Earls of Morton, which conferred the power of judicature over the maritime affairs of the islands. In 1747 the Earl gave up his heritable rights to the crown in return for a cash payment. The post then became a commission granted by the Crown to a nobleman of the country.

Vice-admirals of Orkney and Shetland
Source:
1707–1715 James Douglas, 11th Earl of Morton 
1715–1728 John Sutherland, 16th Earl of Sutherland
1728–1730 Robert Douglas, 12th Earl of Morton
1730–1738 George Douglas, 13th Earl of Morton
1738–1767 James Douglas, 14th Earl of Morton
1767–1761 Sir Lawrence Dundas, 1st Baronet
1781–1820 Sir Thomas Dundas, 2nd Baronet
1823–?1845 James Allan Maconochie (died 1845) (also Sheriff-Depute of Orkney and Shetland 1822–?1845)
1845– Charles Neaves (also Sheriff-Depute 1845–1852)
1853– William Edmonstoune Aytoun (also Sheriff-Depute 1852–1865)

References

Military ranks of the United Kingdom
Vice-Admirals
Orkney and Shetland